Shā Gàn (1885 – 10 July 1913), also known as Baochen or by his nickname Angry, was a democratic revolutionary and anarchist in the late Qing dynasty and the early Republic of China.

Bibliography

External links 
 

1885 births
1913 deaths
Chinese anarchists
Chinese revolutionaries
People of the 1911 Revolution
Assassinated Chinese people
People murdered in China
Tongmenghui members

Murdered anarchists